Dr. Winston Clifton Hackett (1881–1949) was the first African American physician in Arizona. He was the founder of the Booker T. Washington Memorial Hospital, the first hospital in Phoenix which served the African American community.

Early years
Hackett was born in Tyler, Texas, where he received his primary and secondary education. He became a student of the Tuskegee University. The Tuskegee University is a private, historically black university (HBCU) located in Tuskegee, Alabama. It was established by Booker T. Washington.

He continued his medical studies at the Meharry Medical College, which is located in Nashville, Tennessee, United States. The college is a graduate and professional institution affiliated with the United Methodist Church whose mission is to educate health care professionals and scientists. Hackett graduated and earned his medical degree in obstetrics.

Medical practice in Phoenix
Hackett moved to Phoenix in 1916 and established his medical practice in his home which was located at 729 W. Sherman Street. He thus became the first African-American physician in Arizona.  He was married to Ayra Elberta Hammonds Hackett (1896–1932), also a native of Texas, with whom he had two children Winstona Hackett Aldridge (1917–2017) and John Prentice Hackett (1918–1925). In 1925, the family moved to 1334 E. Jefferson Street. Ayra assisted with the deliverance of newborns in their home for five years. This was a time in the history of Phoenix when many African-Americans were often denied medical care because the city was segregated. Hackett also saw to the needs of those of the white race with socially stigmatized ailments who were denied medical care.

His wife, Ayra, was also very active in the community. She founded a weekly newspaper, the Arizona Gleam, in 1929, which she published from their home. She was the only African American female newspaper owner in Arizona. She was also the president of the First Colored Baptist Church’s Baptist Young People’s Union (B.PY.U.).

Booker T. Washington Memorial Hospital

Hackett lobbied for the creation of an African-American community hospital but was unsuccessful. In 1921, Hackett purchased the residence of former Territorial Governor Joseph Kibbey which was located next door to his house at 1342 E. Jefferson St. In 1922, he established the Booker T. Washington Memorial Hospital a private medical in that residence. The hospital didn't have many beds at first and each bed was situated in the screened porch of the house. Hackett purchased three adjoining lots and was, therefore, able to expand the hospital. He also had six cottages built for tuberculosis patients. He charged his patients $12.50 to $35.00 per week for a hospital stay. Hackett opened a pharmacy nearby and recruited Southern African-American nurses with college nursing degrees to join his staff. One of the benefits which the African-American doctors and nurses gained from joining him was the opportunity to gain valuable experience in their chosen field.

Hackett’s hospital grew and soon had 25 beds. However, the hospital did not only dedicate its services to the African-American community, it served other races, too. There were many people seeking more affordable health care and there were those who needed clandestine treatment for sexually transmitted diseases. In 1927, the Arizona Republican (now the Arizona Republic) called it: 

In 1932, Ayra was stricken with pneumonia. On November 13 of that same year she died in her home and was later buried in Phoenix's Greenwood/Memory Lawn Mortuary & Cemetery. Her newspaper, the Arizona Gleam, continued to be published until 1939.

Hackett's Booker T. Washington Memorial Hospital began to suffer economically when a nearby maternity hospital expanded to become a full-service facility. Other factors that had an influence on the hospital's economy were the unpaid bills of some of his patients and his failing eyesight. He had no other choice but to close the hospital in 1943.

Winston Inn
Hackett converted the building where the hospital was once located into an inn which he named the "Winston Inn". The inn served and accommodated African-American servicemen during the World War II era and was frequented by many non-white educators, entertainers and athletes. This lasted until full racial integration was achieved in Phoenix during the Civil Rights era. Both, the Hackett house and hospital building were eventually demolished.

Later years

Hackett's daughter Winstona married Aubrey C. Aldridge in 1943. Aubrey C. Aldridge worked as a school principal at Dunbar and Bethune schools. Winstona, like her father, was very active in the community.  She was a founding member of the Phoenix Chapter of The Links Inc., and a Diamond Soror with 75 years of service in the Alpha Kappa Alpha sorority.

Dr. Hackett died on February 19, 1949, at the age of 67 and is buried in Phoenix's Greenwood/Memory Lawn Mortuary & Cemetery

See also

 List of historic properties in Phoenix

Arizona pioneers
 Mansel Carter
 Bill Downing
 Henry Garfias
 John C. Lincoln
 Paul W. Litchfield
 Joe Mayer
 William John Murphy
 Wing F. Ong
 Levi Ruggles
 Sedona Schnebly
 Michael Sullivan
 Trinidad Swilling
 Ora Rush Weed
 Henry Wickenburg

References

1881 births
1949 deaths
Meharry Medical College alumni
Tuskegee University alumni
African-American people
People from Tyler, Texas
People from Phoenix, Arizona